Urmas Reinsalu (born 22 June 1975) is an Estonian politician serving as the minister of foreign affairs since 18 July 2022 and previously between April 2019 and 26 January 2021. Before that, Urmas has served as the minister of defence between 2012 and 2014, and minister of justice from 2015 to 2019. Reinsalu is a member of the Isamaa ("Fatherland") political party (formerly called the Pro Patria and Res Publica Union), and was the party leader from 2012 to 2015.

Early life and education
Reinsalu was born in Tallinn, Estonia, on 22 June 1975. He graduated from the Tallinn Secondary School No. 37. He then studied law at the University of Tartu, graduating in 1997.

Political career

Early years
From 1996 to 1997, Reinsalu worked as a specialist in public law in the Estonian Ministry of Justice, and as an advisor to then Estonian President from 1996 to 1998. In 1998, Reinsalu was appointed Director of the Office of the President of Estonia, when Lennart Meri was in office. From 2001 to 2002, he worked as the political secretary of the Res Publica Party. From 2002 to 2003, Reinsalu was a lecturer in the Estonian Academy of Security Sciences.

From 2007 to 2013, Reinsalu was a member of the Riigikogu, the unicameral parliament of Estonia. On 28 January 2012, Reinsalu became the chairman of the Pro Patria and Res Publica Union, an Estonian national-conservative, Christian-democratic political party, replacing Mart Laar. He was elected chairman with an absolute majority in the first round of voting at the party congress held in Tallinn.

Minister of Defence (2012-2015)
On 11 May 2012, Reinsalu was appointed minister of defence, replacing Mart Laar, who resigned from office due to health reasons. Reinsalu's term as the minister of defence ended on 26 March 2014, when he was replaced by Sven Mikser. From 2014 to 2015, he was a member of the Riigikogu.

Minister of Justice (2015-2019)
In the 2015 parliamentary election, Reinsalu was re-elected to the Riigikogu with 2,949 individual votes. On 9 April 2015, Reinsalu became the minister of justice in Taavi Rõivas' second cabinet.

As the Pro Patria and Res Publica Union was the biggest loser in the elections with 9 seats lost, Reinsalu announced he would resign as party chairman after the party's congress in June 2015. On 6 June 2015, he was replaced by Margus Tsahkna in the post.

Minister of Foreign Affairs (2019-2021)
Reinsalu was the Estonian Minister of Foreign Affairs from April 2019 until January 2021.

He returned to the foreign ministry in July 2022, after the Prime Minister dismissed her Estonian Centre Party coalition partners.

At the NATO Foreign Ministers meeting in November 2022 Reinsalu stated that "The message is clear: that all NATO allies are aware that the beast also wants to take control of the Western Balkans, and we need - by practical, deliverable support to help these countries to survive."

Controversies 
In 2012, Reinsalu was criticized for endorsing Estonia's "Valentine's Day Law" that declared Estonian WW2 veterans who fought on the side of Nazi Germany (including members of the 20th Waffen Grenadier Division of the SS) "freedom fighters", and for attending the meeting of the Union of Estonian Freedom Fighters (an organization of these veterans) on the island Saaremaa. During his visit, Reinsalu gave a laudatory speech to the veterans for having "liberated Estonia". Later on, in July 2013, he sent his greetings to the Union, praising the organization for "keeping the ideals of liberty alive". 

In January 2014, Reinsalu also drew ire for lauding the Waffen SS veteran Harald Nugiseks, who was the recipient of Nazi Germany's highest military award Knight's Cross of the Iron Cross, at his honorary burial.

Personal life
Reinsalu is married and has two children. He is fluent in English, German, Russian and Finnish.

References

External links

1975 births
21st-century Estonian politicians
Defence Ministers of Estonia
Estonian academics
Government ministers of Estonia
Isamaa politicians
Justice ministers of Estonia
Leaders of political parties in Estonia
Living people
Members of the Riigikogu, 2003–2007
Members of the Riigikogu, 2007–2011
Members of the Riigikogu, 2011–2015
Members of the Riigikogu, 2015–2019
Members of the Riigikogu, 2019–2023
Members of the Riigikogu, 2023–2027
Ministers of Foreign Affairs of Estonia
Politicians from Tallinn
University of Tartu alumni